Bamba Diarrassouba (born 29 March 1989) is a French footballer who plays as a centre back for AC Amiens.

Career
On 19 October 2016, Diarrassouba joined Bulgarian First League side FC Montana, signing until the end of the season. He left the club in June 2017 when his contract expired. In the summer of 2019 Diarrassouba signed a contract with French club AC Amiens.

Personal life
Born in France, Diarrassouba is of Ivorian descent.

References

External links
 

1989 births
Living people
Footballers from Paris
Association football central defenders
French footballers
French expatriate footballers
French sportspeople of Ivorian descent
US Créteil-Lusitanos players
ÉFC Fréjus Saint-Raphaël players
FC Montana players
AC Amiens players
Les Herbiers VF players
Ligue 2 players
Championnat National players
Championnat National 2 players
Championnat National 3 players
First Professional Football League (Bulgaria) players
French expatriate sportspeople in Bulgaria
Expatriate footballers in Bulgaria